The Lure of Crooning Water is a 1920 British silent comedy romance film directed by Arthur Rooke and starring Guy Newall, Ivy Duke and Hugh Buckler. It is adapted from a novel by Marion Hill. It was one of several rural romances that Rooke directed. At least one copy of the film survives.

Plot
As summarised in a film publication, Georgette Verlaine (Duke) is a favourite stage actress that Dr. John Longden (Buckler), who is in love with her, persuades to recuperate in the country as her life is ruining her health. He selects a pretty place called "Crooning Water" where she stays with Horace Dornblazer (Newall), his wife Rachel (Dibley), and their three children. The fact that there is one man who does not fall for her smiles drives her to try and win the admiration of Horace. When she finally gets him where she wants him, she leaves and returns to London. Horace leaves his family and follows her to the city, but she tells him that she did not love him but only admired him for the things he stood for: honour, fidelity, etc. Georgette starts her gay life anew and Horace goes back to his family where he is forgiven. The actress soon tires of her frivolous life and returns to Crooning Water, where she too is forgiven, and then returns to London to marry the doctor.

Cast
 Guy Newall as Horace Dornblazer 
 Ivy Duke as Georgette 
 Hugh Buckler as Dr. John Longden 
 Douglas Munro as Yes Smith 
 Mary Dibley as Rachel Dornblazer 
 Lawford Davidson as Frank Howard 
 Arthur Chesney as Gerald Pinkerton 
 Winifred Sadler as Mrs. Dusenberry

References

Bibliography
 Bamford, Kenton. Distorted Images: British National Identity and Film in the 1920s. I.B. Tauris, 1999.

External links

1920 films
1920 romantic comedy films
British silent feature films
British romantic comedy films
Films directed by Arthur Rooke
Films based on American novels
British black-and-white films
Films set in London
Stoll Pictures films
1920s English-language films
1920s British films
Silent romantic comedy films